Wilson Bruce Evans House is a historic house at 33 East Vine Street in Oberlin, Ohio.  Completed in 1856, it served a major stop on the Underground Railroad, with its builders, Wilson Bruce Evans and Henry Evans, participating the 1858 Oberlin-Wellington Rescue, a celebrated rescue of a slave.  It was declared a National Historic Landmark in 1997.

Description
The Wilson Bruce Evans House is located south of downtown Oberlin, on the south side of East Vine Street opposite Martin Luther King Jr. Park, a small public park behind Oberlin City Hall.  The house is a two-story brick structure, covered by a hip roof.  The roof has extended eaves studded with decorative brackets.  A single-story porch extends across the front, its shed roof supported by square brick piers.  The interior is finished with high-quality woodwork, milled and shaped by Wilson Bruce Evans and Henry Evans.  The house was built 1854-56 by the Evans brothers, two free African-Americans, and was occupied by Wilson Bruce Evans and his family.  At the time of its landmark designation in 1997, it was still in the hands of their descendants.

History
The Evans house was the home of Wilson Bruce Evans, a prominent African-American abolitionist and early benefactor of Oberlin College, the first college to admit students of color. Evans rose to national attention after his importance in the 1858 Oberlin-Wellington Rescue, one of the events that challenged the controversial Fugitive Slave Act of 1850.  Although Evans was not an outspoken abolitionist like his colleagues Sojourner Truth and Frederick Douglass, Evans was cited as a man who "put justice above his own safety." The house was a frequent stop for travelers on the Underground Railroad such as Harriet Tubman.

See also
List of Underground Railroad sites
List of National Historic Landmarks in Ohio

References

External links
National Park Service article about the house
Oberlin College information about the house

National Historic Landmarks in Ohio
Oberlin, Ohio
Houses on the National Register of Historic Places in Ohio
Houses completed in 1856
Houses in Lorain County, Ohio
National Register of Historic Places in Lorain County, Ohio
History of African-American civil rights
Houses on the Underground Railroad